Maadi ( / transliterated:   ) is a leafy and once suburban district in the Southern Area of Cairo, Egypt, on the east bank of the Nile about  upriver from downtown Cairo. The modern extensions north east and east of Maadi, New Maadi and Zahraa al-Maadi are administratively part of the Basatin district. 

The Nile at Maadi is parallelled by the Corniche, a waterfront promenade and the main road north into Cairo. There is no bridge across the Nile at Maadi; the nearest one is located at El Mounib along the Ring Road (Tarik El-Da'eri) on the way north to the downtown.

Maadi's population was estimated to be 85,000 according to the 2017 census. The district is popular with international expatriates as well as Egyptians and is home to many embassies, as well as major international schools, sporting clubs, and cultural institutions such as the Supreme Constitutional Court of Egypt and the national Egyptian Geological Museum.

Name
Ma'ǎdi معادي is the plural form of the word ma'diyya, which means "ferry"; hence, El-Ma'adi literally means "The ferries". There was a story that the name comes from a ferry crossing in the area where ferries carried people from the east side of the Nile to the west.

History
Maadi today stands on the site of a town that has turned out to be a significant predynastic, Ancient Egyptian archaeological site, founded ca. 3500 B.C.  Building activity in the area has destroyed some archaeologically sensitive places.

In Middle Ages the area of Maadi became a Coptic monastic region comprising Deir at-Tin and Deir al-Adawiya. 

Maadi traces its modern history to 1904, when the railway between Cairo to the north and Helwan to the south was built. This, in combination with land speculation by the Mosseri cousins and city planning by Alexander Adams, gave rise to a new town. Construction was originally limited to the area adjacent to the railway, but eventually spread west to the Nile. Also, a large British army camp was built east of the railway.

The town planning was done in 1905 by a Canadian retired officer Captain Alexander J. Adams. His vision led to the wide boulevards and large villas still seen in Maadi today. There were very strict rules associated with residential development in Maadi with regards to the size of houses, how much of the property could be occupied by the house and how much had to be left for the garden, and the size of the sidewalks. Even window shutters had prescribed colours. Other regulations included wireless radio noise control after 22:00 and fines for not maintaining gardens properly.

The world's first solar thermal power station was built in Maadi.

An example of British colonial life in Maadi may be found in The house at Maadi, a short story by Gerald Bullett from his collection The street of the eye (1923).

Second World War

During the period between 1940 and 1946, Maadi had an important role in the Military history of New Zealand during World War II.
The Divisional Cavalry Regiment disembarked on 14 February 1940 and entrained for the New Zealand base camp at Maadi. In total around 76,000 members of the 2nd New Zealand Expeditionary Force trained at a camp near Maadi at the base of the desert slopes of Wadi Degla and Tel al-Maadi. During that time this area belonged to the Delta Land Company which created Maadi in 1907. The rocky plateau was leased to the New Zealand Military Forces, and for the next six years it became the central depot and training area for 2 NZEF in the Middle East.

A British Army interrogation centre was also located in Maadi. In July 1942, at the height of the Western Desert Campaign, two German spies revealed under questioning that they had been using a copy of Daphne du Maurier's Rebecca, found among their possessions, as a codebook for secret, coded radio transmissions. Their equipment, stored on a houseboat on the River Nile, had been examined by a young signals officer from the Egyptian Army, future President of Egypt Anwar Sadat.

Post-1952 revolution
Following the 1952 revolution (which ended the British occupation of the Suez Canal) and the 1956 Suez Crisis, in which Britain, France and Israel launched an invasion of Egypt to regain control of the canal, British and French expatriates living in Maadi and elsewhere were forced to leave by the Egyptian government. As a result, some of their institutions, such as St John's Anglican Church, were taken over and run temporarily by other nationalities.

Administrative divisions and population 
Maadi is a district in the Southern Area of Cairo, and is subdivided into five shiakhas (census blocks).

In the 2017 census Maadi had a total population of  88,575 people spread over the five shiakhas as follows:

Maadi today

The oldest area in Maadi is El Sarayat, composed mostly of villas and low rise buildings. It is the most affluent part of Maadi along with the adjacent Degla area. These two areas are recognizable by the high number of roundabouts, quiet atmosphere and greenery.

There are many flats in Maadi, mostly in lowrise buildings. There are several highrises along the Corniche by the river, as well as in the newer, eastern part of Maadi, known as Degla.

The new Maadi areas include El-Laselky St. and the Autostrad, as well as Masaken El Arays, Saqr kuraish and the houses of the Kuwaiti company, and el basatin el sharkya. which is between saqr kuraish and the houses of the Kuwait company. It is characterized by the large number of oil companies, most notably the Gulf of Suez Oil Company, as well as some other companies.
The Arab region is also the most popular areas in Maadi and the Arab Maadi which is available from shops and crafts and various means of transport and its location, which connects all areas of Maadi.

Maadi is the least densely populated district in Greater Cairo, and much of it is inhabited by well-to-do Egyptians, as well as expatriates, many of whom are connected with embassies, ambassadorial residences and international corporations located in Maadi. The Cairo office for the USAID is also located in Maadi.

Many streets in Maadi continue to have speed bumps as a traffic calming measure.

Atmosphere
Maadi has a reputation for being green, quieter and more relaxed than urban Cairo. In some parts of Maadi, most notably around Cairo American College, there is virtually no traffic noise. The abundant greenery bears little resemblance to most of the crowded areas seen in urban Cairo. This reputation is true of the original core of Maadi and Degla; however, outlying developments such as "New Maadi" have brought in the same treeless neighborhoods and mundane architecture as found in much of the rest of Cairo's metropolitan sprawl.

Economy and retail
Along with its affluent residents, Maadi is home to many major restaurants, outlets and chains as well as a variety of high-end clothing shops, and other retail businesses, many of which are located along the locally famous "Road 9", Nasr st, or new Maadi as well as Maadi's original "downtown" located just south of the Maadi Metro stop on the east side of the track. Road 9 still remains a hub for both locals and expats with its diverse dining options as well as coffee shops and even bookstores. Most notably are expatriate owned businesses such as Lucille's (known for their American style hamburgers) and The BookSpot (an English language bookstore that has become a staple for Egyptians and westerners for more than 15 years). Many businesses come and go but the residents of Maadi can always depend on Road 9 to make them feel right at home.

Taisei Corporation has its North Africa office in Maadi.

Transportation
Maadi is served by the Cairo Metro's Line 1, which has now taken over the Cairo-to-Helwan railway. There are three stops in Maadi – from north to south: Hadayek El Maadi, Maadi and Sakanat (Thakanat) El Maadi. Further metro construction in Maadi is foreseen, but nothing is beyond the proposal stage as yet.

Egyptian National Railways also operates a line through Maadi, but it is strictly a freight line. There is no longer any passenger service; the station is closed.

Nature protected areas in Maadi
 Wadi Degla Protected Area
 Protected fossil trees

Culture
Cultural life in Maadi is geared to a great extent towards serving the large expatriate and affluent, bilingual Egyptian populations. For expatriates, Maadi offers a variety of community activities: religious institutions (many churches and a synagogue), amateur theatre groups, sporting clubs, adult courses, and other interest groups.  The Maadi Sporting Club, for example, has served the local expat and Egyptian communities since 1921. It is also associated with the Maadi Sporting & Yacht Club by the Nile. Maadi has also become a popular place for foreigners to study Arabic, as the suburb now hosts a number of local language schools.

Cultural venues include the new Egyptian Geological Museum and the large Maadi Library.

Cultural life, locally, largely revolves around dining out and shopping. In addition to numerous Western restaurant chains and cafés, Maadi offers a variety of international cuisine. The most popular places for westerners to shop at "local" stores is along Road 9.  There are also international and multilingual bookshops selling foreign newspapers and magazines catering to Maadi's multi-ethnic population.

Educational institutions 

International schools:
Cairo American College
 Lycée Français du Caire Maadi Primary Campus
Victory College
Maadi Community School
Al-Amal Semi-International School
The Higher Institute of Engineering - Thebes Academy
The Higher Institute of Computers - Thebes Academy
AUC - Maadi
Sadat Academy For Management Sciences

Sport
During World War II members of the 2nd NZEF based at Maadi Camp competed in regattas on the Nile against local Egyptian rowing clubs. At a regatta held on 20 November 1943 the Maadi Camp Rowing Club "Kiwi" oarsmen beat the Cairo River Club by 11 points to six to win the Freyberg Cup, which they then gifted to the competitors. In return, as a token of friendship, Youssef Bahgat presented the Kiwis with a cup.

Youssef Bahgat's cup was offered to the NZARA (now NZRA) as a trophy for an annual boys' eight-oared race between secondary schools and was brought to New Zealand at the end of the war. Renamed the Maadi Cup it was first raced for in 1947 at Wanganui where it was won by Mount Albert Grammar School. The Maadi Cup gained its native timber pyramid shaped base from Mt Albert Grammar's woodwork master, Jack Jenkin, in 1951.

The Maadi Sporting Club and Yacht, founded in 1920 by British expatriates who mainly worked at the Delta Real Estate Company, today offers a range of sports, such as Tennis, Football, Swimming, Squash, handball, hockey, Judo, Table Tennis, Sailing, and Rowing.

Victory College is no longer the home of a men's and women's softball league as well as a men's rugby league.  Softball has not been played since 2015 and rugby ceased to be played in 2003.

Embassies

 Azerbaijan embassy
Argentinian embassy
 Bangladesh embassy
 Cuban embassy
 Japanese embassy
 Malawian embassy
 Mexican embassy
 Mongolian embassy
 Paraguayan embassy
 Peruvian embassy
 Philippine embassy
 South African embassy
South Korean embassy
 Ugandan embassy
 Ukrainian embassy
 Venezuelan embassy
 Kenyan embassy
 Gabonese embassy

See also

 Helwan
 15th of May City
 Greater Cairo

Notes

References
 
 
 
DeVries, Annalise J.K. (2021) Maadi: The Making and Unmaking of a Cairo Suburb 1878-1962. Cairo: The American University in Cairo Press. 
 Maadi History
 Maadi Online - Brief Information
 Reasons to live in Maadi – Brief Information

External links
 
 www.maadi.Guide Ultimate Nerd Guide To Maadi District

Archaeological sites in Egypt
History of Cairo
Former populated places in Egypt